Chloroleucon tortum is a flowering plant endemic to Brazil and Paraguay.

References

tortum
Trees of Brazil
Critically endangered plants
Taxonomy articles created by Polbot